Methylocystis bryophila is a Gram-negative, aerobic, facultatively methanotrophic and non-motile bacterium species from the genus of Methylocystis which has been isolated from Sphagnum peat from the Großer Teufelssee in Germany.

References

Further reading

External links
Type strain of Methylocystis bryophila at BacDive -  the Bacterial Diversity Metadatabase

Methylocystaceae
Bacteria described in 2013